Willie McGee is a former professional American football player who played wide receiver for the San Diego Chargers, Los Angeles Rams, San Francisco 49ers, and Detroit Lions.

References

1950 births
American football wide receivers
Los Angeles Rams players
Detroit Lions players
San Diego Chargers players
San Francisco 49ers players
Alcorn State Braves football players
Living people
Players of American football from New Orleans